Parkpoom "M" Jangphonak (born 7 October 1975) is a retired Thai professional boxer in Welterweight division, in addition he is also an amateur boxer who has competed in the Olympic Games for two times and is a former Muay Thai kickboxer.

Muay Thai & Amateur Boxing Career
Parkpoom was born at Udon Thani Province, Isan region, where is his father native. After that, he moved to live and grow up in Tambon Samrong Nuea's Dan Samrong neighbourhood, Mueang Samut Prakan, Samut Prakan Province. His father, Yuthaphum Jangphonak, owns a boxing gym "Panyuthaphum", which has many famous boxers such as  Venice Borkhorsor WBC & Lineal Flyweight champion in 70s and Langsuan Panyuthaphum, a famous Muay Thai kickboxer in 80s. He has ambition since childhood want to be a first Thai boxer who won Olympic gold medal, inspired by Dhawee Umponmaha, a 1984 Olympics silver medalist in Light welterweight division.

He started boxing at the age of 9 from Muay Thai by fighting regularly at Samrong Stadium his native in name "M16 Borkhorsor" (เอ็ม16 บ.ข.ส.) because he punched quickly like an  M16 rifle.

Later in the early 1996, he was persuaded to amateur boxing. It only takes 3 months he became a Thai athlete at the 1996 Olympics at Atlanta in Welterweight division. He was qualified by fought at Siam Om Noi Stadium, Om Noi, outskirts Bangkok on undercard of the Muay Thai event, which broadcast on Channel 3 regularly at noon on Saturday. He was considered to be the youngest and least experienced boxer of Thailand national team with also had to compete first. Round of 32 result he was a loser to Serhiy Dzyndzyruk, a Ukrainian boxer 10-20.

He continues to amateur boxing, at the 13th Asian Games in late 1998 at Bangkok. He won the gold medal in Welterweight division and he was #1 on this weight class of the ranking of AIBA too.

At the 2000 Olympics at Sydney, Australia, he continued to participate in the amateur boxing tournament. He won the first round by defeating Geard Ajetović a Serbian boxer equally 9-9, must be decided by the number of punches. In the second round he was a loser to future silver medalist Serhiy Dotsenko a Ukrainian boxer 5-13, which resulted in his disappointment and retired from amateur boxing eventually and turn into a Taekwondo instead.

Professional Boxing Career &  Retirement
In 2003, he switched to professional boxing under Songchai Rattanasuban of Onesongchai Promotion.  He won PABA Welterweight champion in his seventh fight in 2005, but after three defeats in Australia and lost the champion  he finally retired in 2007.

Parkpoom graduated with a bachelor's degree in communication arts from Thongsuk College and master's degree in sports science from Srinakharinwirot University. After retirement, he opened a pet shop behind Seri Center, Prawet District, Bangkok. He is currently a lecturer at Udon Thani Rajabhat University including as a boxing coach for athletes of the university as well.

Muay Thai record

|-  style="background:#cfc;"
| 1995-07-17 ||Win||align=left| Saenkeng Pinsinchai || Rajadamnern Stadium || Bangkok, Thailand || Decision || 5 || 3:00
|-  style="background:#cfc;"
| 1994-09-06 ||Win||align=left| Kongnapa Watcharawit || Lumpinee Stadium || Bangkok, Thailand || Decision || 5 || 3:00
|-  style="background:#cfc;"
| 1994-07-27 ||Win||align=left| Saen Tor Pranchai || Lumpinee Stadium || Bangkok, Thailand || Decision || 5 || 3:00
|-  style="background:#fbb;"
| 1994-06-01 ||Loss||align=left| Kongnapa Watcharawit || Rajadamnern Stadium || Bangkok, Thailand || Decision || 5 || 3:00
|-  style="background:#cfc;"
| 1994-05-13 ||Win||align=left| Buakaw Por.Pisichet || Lumpinee Stadium || Bangkok, Thailand || Decision || 5 || 3:00
|-  style="background:#cfc;"
| 1994-02-18 ||Win||align=left| Suwitlek Sor Sakowarat|| Lumpinee Stadium || Bangkok, Thailand || Decision || 5 || 3:00
|-  style="background:#fbb;"
| 1993-12-07 ||Loss||align=left| Noppadet Sor.Rewadee || Rajadamnern Stadium || Bangkok, Thailand || Decision || 5 || 3:00
|-  style="background:#fbb;"
| 1993-11-25 ||Loss||align=left| Pepsi Biyapan || Lumpinee Stadium || Bangkok, Thailand || Decision || 5 || 3:00
|-  style="background:#cfc;"
| 1993-09-10 ||Win||align=left| Phanomrung Sitsarawat || Lumpinee Stadium || Bangkok, Thailand || Decision || 5 || 3:00
|-  style="background:#fbb;"
| 1993-06-22 ||Loss||align=left| Kangwannoi Sor Sribualoy || Lumpinee Stadium || Bangkok, Thailand || Decision || 5 || 3:00
|-  style="background:#cfc;"
| 1993-04-27 ||Win||align=left| Changnoi Srimongkol  || Lumpinee Stadium || Bangkok, Thailand || Decision || 5||3:00
|-  style="background:#cfc;"
| 1993-02-16 ||Win||align=left| Charoenchai Sitsothon || Lumpinee Stadium || Bangkok, Thailand || KO (Punches)|| 3 ||
|-  style="background:#cfc;"
| 1993-01-15 ||Win||align=left| Kangwannoi Sor Sribualoy || Lumpinee Stadium || Bangkok, Thailand || Decision || 5 || 3:00 
|-
| colspan=9 | Legend:

See also
Thailand at the 1996 Summer Olympics
Thailand at the 1998 Asian Games
Thailand at the 2000 Summer Olympics

References

External links
 

Living people
1975 births
Welterweight boxers
Parkpoom Jangphonak
Parkpoom Jangphonak
Parkpoom Jangphonak
Light-middleweight boxers
Middleweight boxers
Parkpoom Jangphonak
Boxing trainers
Parkpoom Jangphonak
Medalists at the 1998 Asian Games
Boxers at the 1998 Asian Games
Boxers at the 1996 Summer Olympics
Boxers at the 2000 Summer Olympics
Parkpoom Jangphonak
Parkpoom Jangphonak
Asian Games medalists in boxing